Repalle is a town in Bapatla district of the Indian state of Andhra Pradesh. The town is one of the 12 municipalities in Bapatla district and the headquarters of Repalle mandal under the administration of Bapatla revenue division. It is situated near Krishna River in the Coastal Andhra region of the state.

History 

The name Repalle is actually formed from two words: Revu (river or bank of the river) and Palle (village). Originally known as Revupalle, the name has evolved to Repalle over time.

Geography 

The nearest towns are Tenali, Bapatla in the Guntur district, and Machilipatnam in the Krishna district.

Climate 

Repalle is located 25 km from the sea coast. It is generally hot and humid during summer with temperatures ranging between 28 and 42 C on average. Winters are milder with temperatures between 15 and 30 C on average. Heavy rains are experienced between July and November during monsoon time.

Demographics 

 census, the town had a population of 50,866. The total population constitute, 24,385 males and 26,481 females —a sex ratio of 1086 females per 1000 males. 4,308 children are in the age group of 0–6 years, of which 2,184 are boys and 2,124 are girls. The average literacy rate stands at 81.32% with 37,862 literates, significantly higher than the state average of 67.41%.

Government and politics

Civic Administration 
Repalle Municipality is a second grade municipality, which was established in the year 1965. The present Municipal Commissioner of the town is Vijaya Saradhi. The present Municipal Chairperson of the town is smt.Katta Mangi of Yscrp. The municipal department maintains amenities such as public taps, public bore-wells, drains, roads, street lights, public parks etc. Others include dispensaries, elementary and secondary schools etc.

Politics 
Repalle is a part of Repalle Assembly constituency for Andhra Pradesh Legislative Assembly. Anagani Satya Prasad is the present MLA of the constituency from Telugu Desam Party. The assembly segment in turn is a part of Bapatla (SC) Lok Sabha constituency, which was won by Nandigam Suresh of YuvajanaSramikaRaithuCongress Party(ysrcp).

Notable people 
K. Viswanath, a film director
S. Janaki, playback singer
Samudrala Sr., screenwriter
C. V. S. K. Sarma, economist and a retired IAS officer
V. Nagayya, actor

Transport 

The Repalle bus station is owned and operated by APSRTC. The bus station is also equipped with a bus depot for storage and maintenance of buses.

Education 
The primary and secondary school education is imparted by government, aided and private schools, under the School Education Department of the state. The medium of instruction followed by different schools are English and Telugu.

See also 
Villages in Repalle mandal

References

External links 

Towns in Guntur district
Mandal headquarters in Guntur district